The women's 1500 metres event at the 2010 World Junior Championships in Athletics was held in Moncton, New Brunswick, Canada, at Moncton Stadium on 23 and 25 July.

Medalists

Results

Final
25 July

Heats
23 July

Heat 1

Heat 2

Heat 3

Participation
According to an unofficial count, 34 athletes from 27 countries participated in the event.

References

1500 metres
1500 metres at the World Athletics U20 Championships
2010 in women's athletics